Tuppence Middleton (born 21 February 1987) is an English actress known for her performances in film, television and theatre. In 2010, she was nominated for the London Evening Standard Film Awards for Most Promising Newcomer.

Middleton appeared in various films before making her breakthrough in Morten Tyldum's historical drama The Imitation Game (2014), and subsequently appeared in The Wachowskis' science fiction film Jupiter Ascending (2015), Alfonso Gomez-Rejon's historical drama The Current War (2017), David Fincher's film Mank (2020), and the historical drama films Downton Abbey (2019) and Downton Abbey: A New Era (2022).

She made her first television appearance in Bones (2008) and subsequently appeared as a guest in New Tricks (2010), Friday Night Dinner (2011), and Lewis (2013). She also appeared as Jem the Black Mirror episode "White Bear" (2013), as Miss Havisham in Dickensian (2015–2016), as Russian princess Hélène Kuragina in War & Peace (2016), and as Riley "Blue" Gunnarsdóttir in Sense8 (2015–2018).

Early life
Middleton was born in Bristol on 21 February 1987, the daughter of Tina and Nigel Middleton. She has an older sister named Angel and younger brother named Josh. She was named "Tuppence" after the childhood nickname her grandmother gave to her mother. She was raised in Clevedon, Somerset. She has described her younger self as shy, reclusive, and "geeky" at school, but "quite loud and brash" at home; she found youth theatre an "outlet" in which she could be confident. She attended Bristol Grammar School, where she was involved in school plays such as Guys and Dolls. She also attended Stagecoach, a performing arts school in Portishead. She appeared in local drama productions, including a pantomime with her sister at the Princes Hall in Clevedon. She subsequently studied acting at the Arts Educational School in London, earning an honours degree in acting.

Career
Middleton gained a following for her appearance in the 2009 British comedy horror film Tormented. Her character, head girl Justine Fielding, dates one of the most popular boys in school, only to find that he and his friends were responsible for a classmate's death. She has also appeared in adverts for the chewing gum Extra and for Sky TV.

In 2010, she was nominated for the London Evening Standard Film Awards 2010 for Most Promising Newcomer and she starred in Samuel Abrahams's BAFTA-nominated short film Connect. In 2011, she played the character Tanya Green in the British sitcom Friday Night Dinner, and Sarah in Sirens. In 2012, she appeared in the spy thriller film Cleanskin.

In 2013, she made her professional theatre debut in The Living Room, before playing a minor role in Danny Boyle's psychological thriller film Trance and bringing the highly-praised performance in the Black Mirror episode "White Bear". In 2014, after working on Lilly and Lana Wachowski's space opera film Jupiter Ascending (2015), she joined the main cast of their Netflix science fiction series Sense8 (2015–2018).

In 2016, she starred in the BBC drama War & Peace, playing Russian aristocrat Princess Hélène Kuragina. The series received critical acclaim. The Daily Express said: "Rising star Tuppence Middleton takes on the role of the delightfully evil Hélène Kuragina, who is one half of the incestuous duo. Audiences witnessed her brother getting a little too intimate with his sibling in the first episode before she turned her attentions to Pierre and dug her claws into him. She is a vile character who will use and abuse Pierre without giving him a second thought." Andrew Davies, who adapted War and Peace, described Middleton's Hélène as "the naughtiest woman on TV at the moment".

In 2018, she starred in Vicky Jones' play The One at the Soho Theatre in London and got the part of Lucy in the feature film Downton Abbey (2019), which she later reprised in Downton Abbey: A New Era (2022). In 2019, she played the lead role in the mystery drama Disappearance at Clifton Hill. This film was soon followed by the psychological horror Possessor (2020), the Netflix-distributed historical miniseries The Defeated (2020), also known as Shadowplay, and David Fincher's biographical drama Mank (2020), in which she portrayed the wife of Herman J. Mankiewicz, the co-writer of Citizen Kane (1941).

She narrated BBC World Service documentaries about the Spitfire and the life of Prince Philip, Duke of Edinburgh in 2020 and 2021, respectively. She recently starred alongside Martin Compston and Rupert Penry-Jones in ITV1's drama Our House (2022), and is set to star in the folk horror film Lord of Misrule with Ralph Ineson and Matt Stokoe, directed by William Brent Bell.

Personal life
Middleton has obsessive–compulsive disorder (OCD) that she developed at the age of 12. In 2021, she conducted a series of interviews on the matter for BBC Radio 4, in which she talked with a clinical psychologist and a couple of other people struggling with the disorder. Middleton revealed that she "struggles with self-imposed routines that sometimes stop her leaving the house, as well as obsessive mental counting and compulsive checking behaviours". She also stated that she suffers from emetophobia, a fear of vomiting, which increases her excessive preoccupation with cleanliness.

In August 2022 it was reported that Middleton had given birth to her first child with Swedish film director Måns Mårlind.

Filmography

Films

Television

Theatre

Music videos

Video games

References

External links
 
 

Living people
1987 births
21st-century English actresses
Actresses from Bristol
Actresses from Somerset
English film actresses
English television actresses
People educated at Bristol Grammar School
People educated at the Arts Educational Schools
People from Clevedon
People with obsessive–compulsive disorder